Chionodes donatella is a moth in the family Gelechiidae. It is found in Florida, Jamaica and Cuba.

Adults are cupreous-brown, the forewings with two white spots, the first on the costa at three-fourths and the second on the interior border beyond the middle. The hindwings are a little paler.

References

Chionodes
Moths described in 1864
Moths of North America